al-Bir Fawqani is a village in northern Aleppo Governorate, northern Syria.

With 618 inhabitants, as per the 2004 census, al-Bir Fawqani administratively belongs to Nahiya Jarabulus within Jarabulus District. Nearby localities include Turaykham  to the west, al-Bir Tahtani  to the northeast, and Qandariyah  to the south.

References

Villages in Aleppo Governorate